The women's relay competition of the Biathlon World Championships 2012 was held on March 10, 2012 at 15:15 local time.

Results 
The race was started at 15:15.

References

Biathlon World Championships 2012
2012 in German women's sport